Kings Creek or King's Creek, or Kingscreek may refer to:

Communities
Kingscreek, Ohio, an unincorporated community
Kings Creek, South Carolina, an unincorporated community near King's Creek Furnace Site
Kings Creek, West Virginia, an unincorporated community in Hancock County
Kings Creek, Queensland, a locality in Toowoomba Region, Australia

Rivers

Canada
Kings Creek (Jock River tributary), in eastern Ontario
Kings Creek (Mississippi River Ontario), in eastern Ontario

United States
Kings Creek, a tributary of the North Fork Feather River in California
King's Creek (Maryland)
Kings Creek (Ohio)
Kings Creek (Ohio River tributary), a stream in West Virginia and Pennsylvania
Kings Creek (Elk Creek tributary), in Pennsylvania
King's Creek (Texas)

Other
Kings Creek Falls, near Long Creek, South Carolina

See also 
 King Creek (disambiguation)
 Kings (disambiguation)
 Kings River (disambiguation)